Peripatopsis cederbergiensis is a species of velvet worm in the family Peripatopsidae. This species is a clade in the P. balfouri species complex. Males of this species have 17 clawed legs with the last pair highly reduced, whereas females have a complete foot with claws on the reduced leg. This species is charcoal black in color and ranges from 9 mm to 15 mm in length. Also known as the Cederberg velvet worm, this species is endemic to the Cederberg Mountains of South Africa.

References

Endemic fauna of South Africa
Onychophorans of temperate Africa
Onychophoran species
Animals described in 2013